Ginza is an MTR Light Rail stop. It is located at ground level in the centre of Tin Shing Road in Tin Shui Wai, Yuen Long District. It began service on 7 December 2003 and belongs to Zone 4. It is the only station on the MTR network with a Japanese name, and it is one of the two Light Rail stops with announcements in Mandarin Chinese.

The stop is near ＋WOO (Formerly Kingswood Ginza, which gave the name of this stop) and Kingswood Villas Phase 4.

References

MTR Light Rail stops
Former Kowloon–Canton Railway stations
Tin Shui Wai
Railway stations in Hong Kong opened in 2003
MTR Light Rail stops named from housing estates